Sanmiguelia lewisi is an extinct plant genus, possibly of flowering plants. The fossil was first described from Late Triassic Chinle Formation in Colorado, and later in Lower Jurassic Moenave Formation in Utah. The species has been suggested to be one of the more primitive angiosperm fossils.

References

Prehistoric angiosperm genera
Enigmatic angiosperm taxa
Triassic plants
Jurassic plants